Solute carrier family 39 member 11 is a protein that in humans is encoded by the SLC39A11 gene.

References

Further reading